XHJRZ-FM is a noncommercial radio station on 90.7 FM in Jerez, Zacatecas. The station is owned by Grupo Radiofónico ZER and is known as Inolvidable.

History
XHJRZ is one of Grupo ZER's permit stations. It received its permit on October 3, 2012.

References

Radio stations in Zacatecas
Radio stations established in 2012